The Caldwell United States Post Office, located at 14 N. Main St. in Caldwell, Kansas, was listed on the National Register of Historic Places in 1989.  It is Classical Revival in style and was built in 1941.

It includes a tempura mural Cowboys Driving Cattle by artist Kenneth Evett.

It was listed on the National Register as US Post Office--Caldwell.

References

Government buildings on the National Register of Historic Places in Kansas
Neoclassical architecture in Kansas
Government buildings completed in 1941
National Register of Historic Places in Sumner County, Kansas